James Mann (June 22, 1822, Gorham, Maine – August 26, 1868, New Orleans, Louisiana) was an American politician.  He served in the Maine legislature and was elected as a Democrat to the United States House of Representatives from Louisiana's 2nd congressional district but died just five weeks into his term.

Mann was a member of the Maine House of Representatives (1849–50) and Maine Senate (1851–53).  He was a major in the Union Army during the American Civil War, serving as a paymaster.  After the war, he remained in New Orleans as a Treasury agent.  He was elected as part of Louisiana's next congressional delegation after the state was readmitted to representation; he took his seat on July 18, 1868, and died on August 26, 1868.

The special election to succeed Mann was won by John Willis Menard, the first African American ever elected to Congress, but the House of Representatives declined to seat him.

See also
List of United States Congress members who died in office (1790–1899)

External links

 "Funeral of the Hon. James Mann in New-Orleans", New York Times, August 28, 1868 (subscription required)

1822 births
1868 deaths
Union Army officers
Members of the Maine House of Representatives
Maine state senators
People from Gorham, Maine
Politicians from New Orleans
19th-century American politicians
Democratic Party members of the United States House of Representatives from Louisiana